Thomas Alan Campbell (born 11 September 1944) is a retired Northern Irish football goalkeeper who played in the Football League for Grimsby Town. After his retirement as a player, he embarked on a long career in management.

References

Association footballers from Northern Ireland
NIFL Premiership players
Association football fullbacks
1944 births
Association footballers from Belfast
Coleraine F.C. players
English Football League players
Grimsby Town F.C. players
Northern Ireland amateur international footballers
Living people
Glenavon F.C. players
NIFL Premiership managers
Glenavon F.C. managers
Ballymena United F.C. managers
Lisburn Distillery F.C. managers
Ballyclare Comrades F.C. managers
Bangor F.C. managers
Carrick Rangers F.C. managers
Northern Ireland youth international footballers
Irish League representative players
Football managers from Northern Ireland